Thomas Haxby (25 January 1729 – 31 October 1796) was an English instrument maker, particularly of keyboard instruments, including harpsichords, pianos, and organs.

After an early career as a parish clerk at St Michael-le-Belfry in York, and as a singer at York Minster, he opened an instrument shop in York in 1756.  During the late 1750s he acquired a reputation as an organ tuner and repairman, and began building organs as well as other instruments in the 1760s.  His square pianos – of which he made between 24 and 36 per year, gradually increasing the number towards 1790 – are highly regarded.  After his death his shop passed to his nephew and brother-in-law, who changed the name to Tomlinson & Son.

Notes

References

 Margaret Cranmer. "Haxby, Thomas." In Grove Music Online. Oxford Music Online, http://www.oxfordmusiconline.com/subscriber/article/grove/music/12608 (accessed June 22, 2009).
 David Haxby & John Malden 'Thomas Haxby of York (1729–96): an extraordinary musician and instrument maker.' British Institute of Organ Studies Journal, Vol.7, ?1984
 David Haxby & John Malden 'Thomas Haxby of York (1729-1796) - an extraordinary musician and musical instrument maker.'  York Historian, Vol. 2, 1978 43-55
 David Haxby and John Malden. Thomas Haxby and the organ of Louth Parish Church: 1767-9 - C.J.Sturman and J.C.Pillans. British Institute of Organ Studies Journal Vol.8, 1984
 J Pillans: A History of the Organs in Louth Parish Church

1729 births
1796 deaths
Piano makers
Organ builders of the United Kingdom